Night Music is a live album led by trumpeter Woody Shaw which was recorded in New York City in 1982 and released on the Elektra/Musician label. Master of the Art was recorded at the same appearance and date.

Reception

Michael G. Nastos of Allmusic called it, "one of his strongest efforts in the latter days of the fiery, iconic trumpeter's brilliant career".

Track listing 
 "Orange Crescent" (Steve Turre) - 11:54
 "To Kill a Brick"(Woody Shaw) - 12:15
 "Apex" (Mulgrew Miller) - 10:51
 "All the Things You Are" (Oscar Hammerstein II, Jerome Kern) - 12:57

Personnel 
Woody Shaw - trumpet, flugelhorn
Bobby Hutcherson - vibraphone 
Steve Turre - trombone
Mulgrew Miller - piano 
Stafford James - bass
Tony Reedus - drums

References 

Woody Shaw live albums
1983 live albums
Elektra/Musician live albums
Albums produced by Michael Cuscuna